St. Sava Peak is the rocky, partly ice-free peak rising to 872 m in Poibrene Heights on Oscar II Coast, Graham Land in Antarctica.  It is overlooking Vaughan Inlet to the east-northeast.

The feature is named after the Bulgarian scholar St. Sava Sedmochislenik (9-10th century AD), a disciple of St. Cyril and St. Methodius.

Location

Maps
 Antarctic Digital Database (ADD). Scale 1:250000 topographic map of Antarctica. Scientific Committee on Antarctic Research (SCAR). Since 1993, regularly upgraded and updated.

Notes

References
 St. Sava Peak. SCAR Composite Antarctic Gazetteer.
 Bulgarian Antarctic Gazetteer. Antarctic Place-names Commission. (details in Bulgarian, basic data in English)

External links
 St. Sava Peak. Copernix satellite image

Mountains of Graham Land
Oscar II Coast
Bulgaria and the Antarctic